Cochlospermum is a genus of trees in the Bixaceae family; some classifications place this genus in the family Cochlospermaceae. It is native to tropical regions of the world, particularly Latin America, Africa, the Indian Subcontinent, and Australia.

Some species of Cochlospermum (C. tinctorium) have been used as a yellow dyestuff on leather products and fabrics.

Species
Species include:
Cochlospermum angolense Welw. ex Oliv.  - Angola, Zaïre
Cochlospermum fraseri Planch. - Western Australia, Northern Territory
Cochlospermum gillivraei Benth. - Northern Territory, Queensland, Papua New Guinea
Cochlospermum intermedium Mildbr - Central African Republic
Cochlospermum noldei Poppend. - Angola
Cochlospermum orinocense (Kunth) Steud. - Panama, Colombia, Venezuela, the Guianas, Brazil, Peru 
Cochlospermum planchonii Hook.f. ex Planch. - tropical Africa from Sierra Leone to Sudan
Cochlospermum regium (Schrank) Pilg. - Brazil, Bolivia, Paraguay
Cochlospermum religiosum (L.) Alston - India, Sri Lanka, Western Himalayas, Myanmar; naturalized in Cambodia, Java, Bali, Peninsular Malaysia
Cochlospermum tetraporum Hallier - Bolivia, Paraguay, northwestern Argentina
Cochlospermum tinctorium Perrier ex A.Rich. - tropical Africa from Sierra Leone to Uganda
Cochlospermum vitifolium (Willd.) Spreng. - Mexico, Cuba, Central America, Colombia, Venezuela, Guianas, Peru, Ecuador, Brazil; naturalized in Trinidad, Lesser Antilles, Puerto Rico, Hispaniola, Bahamas
Cochlospermum wittei Robyns - Zaïre

Gallery

References

 
Malvales genera
Plant dyes